Keon Johnson (born September 29, 1995) is an American former professional basketball player. He played college basketball at Winthrop University, where he was named Big South Conference Player of the Year in 2017.

Johnson passed the 2,000 career point mark in a 2017 Big South tournament game, making him Winthrop's all-time Division I scoring leader. Johnson led the Eagles to the tournament championship, earning MVP honors and helping the team advance to the 2017 NCAA tournament. At the close of the season, Johnson was named Big South Player of the Year and an honorable mention All-American by the Associated Press.

In 2020, Johnson was voted into the 2010-19 Big South Men's Basketball All-Decade Team.

References

External links
Winthrop Eagles bio

1995 births
Living people
American expatriate basketball people in Kosovo
American men's basketball players
Basketball players from Ohio
KB Prishtina players
Point guards
Sportspeople from Mansfield, Ohio
Winthrop Eagles men's basketball players